Trifolium resupinatum (reversed clover, Persian clover, shaftal, syn. It is native to central and southern Europe, the Mediterranean, and southwest Asia as far south as the Punjab. It is an important hay crop in cold regions of Iran, Afghanistan and other Asian areas with cold winters.

Subspecies
Trifolium resupinatum var. majus Boss (syn. T. suaveolens Willd.)
Trifolium resupinatum var. resupinatum Gib & Belli.
Trifolium resupinatum var. microcephalum Zoh.

Notes 

resupinatum
Plants described in 1753
Flora of Western Asia
Flora of Europe
Flora of North Africa
Taxa named by Carl Linnaeus